The following is a list of German naval ports during World War II.  Ports operated by the Kriegsmarine were divided into two classes - major and minor.  For most major ports, a port commander (Hafenkommandanten) was the senior most officer in charge of the port.  Ports in the same geographical area were grouped together under administrative units known as Hafenkommandanten im Bereich.  Vessels assigned within German ports were organized into harbor defense flotillas.

Smaller ports were overseen by "Port captains" (Hafenkapitäne); however, in some larger ports this title was also used for the port commander.  Both major and minor port commanders reported to a naval area commander (Der Kommandant im Abschnitt), who in turn administratively reported to a Navy district commander.  For operational military defense, ports were also assigned to one of several sea defense zones.

Major German Ports

For major ports within Germany, a position of "Naval Superintendent" (Marineintendantur) served as the port commander and answered directly to the commanders of the Navy regions.  Naval superintendent positions established during World War II included Bremen, Wilhelmshaven, Kiel, and Hamburg.  The superintendent at Kiel also possessed a deputy port captain.

Naval superintendents were allocated a staff of various department heads to oversee activities in the various German ports.  These include a building superintendent (Marine-Baudirektion), naval arsenal (Kriegsmarinearsenal), personnel office (Kriegsmarinedienststelle), and communications unit (Marinenachrichtenabteilung).  The larger German ports also typically maintained a naval brig (Prisenhof).

North Sea and Baltic Sea

Kriegsmarine ports in the North and Baltic Seas were organized into the following two geographical areas.

Hafenkommandanten im Bereich der Nordsee

Port commanders

 Hafenkommandant Delfzijl 	
 Hafenkommandant Groningen 	
 Hafenkommandant Harlingen

Port captains

 Hafenkapitän Emden
 Hafenkapitän Helgoland

Hafenkommandanten im Bereich der Ostsee

Port commanders

 Hafenkommandant Eckernförde
 Hafenkommandant Mürwik 	
 Hafenkommandant Neustadt
 Hafenkommandant Stralsund
 Hafenkommandant Swinemünde

Port captains

 Hafenkapitän Danzig-Neufahrwasser
 Hafenkapitän Gotenhafen
 Hafenkapitän Hela
 Hafenkapitän Kiel 	
 Hafenkapitän Libau
 Hafenkapitän Memel
 Hafenkapitän Pillau
 Hafenkapitän Travemünde
 Hafenkapitän Warnemünde
 Hafenkapitän Windau

Hafenkommandanten im Bereich des Marinebefehlshabers Dänemark

Port commanders

 Hafenkommandant Esbjerg
 Hafenkommandant Tyborön

Port captains

 Hafenkapitän Aalborg 	
 Hafenkapitän Aarhus
 Hafenkapitän Esbjerg
 Hafenkapitän Frederica 	
 Hafenkapitän Frederikshavn 	
 Hafenkapitän Gjedser
 Hafenkapitän Helsingör
 Hafenkapitän Hirtshals
 Hafenkapitän Kalundborg
 Hafenkapitän Kopenhagen
 Hafenkapitän Korsör 	
 Hafenkapitän Nyborg (Ryborg) 	
 Hafenkapitän Skagen 	
 Hafenkapitän Tyborön

Norway

German ports in occupied Norway were among the more numerous of sea ports outside of Germany's given Norway's direct access to the North Sea.

Hafenkommandanten im Bereich des Kommandierenden Admirals Norwegen

Port commanders

 Hafenkommandant Haugesund
 Hafenkommandant Kirkenes

Port captains

France and the Low Countries

German ports in the occupied Netherlands and France are listed below.

Hafenkommandanten im Bereich des Marinebefehlshabers der Niederlande

Port commanders

 Hafenkommandant Amsterdam
 Hafenkommandant Antwerpen
 Hafenkommandant Den Helder
 Hafenkommandant Hoek van Holland
 Hafenkommandant Ijmuiden
 Hafenkommandant Rotterdam
 Hafenkommandant Vlissingen

Port captains

 Hafenkapitän Harlingen
 Hafenkapitän Groningen

Hafenkommandanten im Bereich des Kommandierenden Admirals Frankreich bzw.

Port commanders

Port captains

 Hafenkapitän Cannes
 Hafenkapitän La Ciotat
 Hafenkapitän Le Tréport 
 Hafenkapitän Les Sables d'Olonne
 Hafenkapitän Lezardieux
 Hafenkapitän Nizza 	
 Hafenkapitän St. Louis de Rhone
 Hafenkapitän Royan 	
 Hafenkapitän St. Malo 		
 Hafenkapitän St. Tropez

Channel Islands

The following German ports on the Channel Islands were the only occupied British ports that the Kriegsmarine controlled during the course of the Second World War.

 Hafenkommandant Alderney
 Hafenkommandant Guernsey
 Hafenkommandant Jersey
 Hafenkommandant Kanalinseln or Channel Islands

Belgium ports

The following Belgium ports were overseen by the port authorities in occupied France

 Hafenkommandant Nieuport (Flanders)
 Hafenkommandant Ostende
 Hafenkommandant Zeebrügge

Black  Sea and Aegean sea

German ports in the Black Sea and the Aegean were organized into two geographical areas

Hafenkommandanten im Bereich des Admirals Schwarzes Meer

Port commanders

 Hafenkommandant Berdjansk
 Hafenkommandant Genitschesk
 Hafenkommandant Feodosia
 Hafenkommandant Jalta
 Hafenkommandant Kertsch
 Hafenkommandant Mariupol
 Hafenkommandant Nikolajew
 Hafenkommandant Odessa
 Hafenkommandant Otschakow
 Hafenkommandant Sewastopol
 Hafenkommandant Taganrog

Port captains

 Hafenkapitän Ak Metschet
 Hafenkapitän Balaklawa
 Hafenkapitän Cherson 	
 Hafenkapitän Eupatoria
 Hafenkapitän Nogaisk
 Hafenkapitän Nowo-Petrowskoje 
 Hafenkapitän Otschakow-Nord		 	
 Hafenkapitän Skadowsk

Hafenkommandanten im Bereich des Admirals Ägäis

Port commanders

Port captains

 Hafenkapitän Skopelos
 Hafenkapitän Koupho

Baltic sea ports

The Baltic sea ports of Latvia, Lithuania, and Estonia were under the command of the Hafenkommandanten im Bereich des Admirals Ostland.  Two more major harbors, under port commanders, were at Riga and Reval.  Smaller harbors, under port captains, were as follows.

 Hafenkapitän Baltischport 	
 Hafenkapitän Krivorutschi
 Hafenkapitän Libau
 Hafenkapitän Lowkolowo (Saint Petersburg)
 Hafenkapitän Peipa	
 Hafenkapitän Pernau 	
 Hafenkapitän Rutschi
 Hafenkapitän Windau

Mediterranean Sea

German ports in the Mediterranean Sea were overseen by a single command encompassing all Italian, Albanian, and Dalmatian harbors.  The Italian naval area was the only one of the three regions to maintain smaller harbors at the port captain level.

Hafenkommandanten im Bereich Italien, Dalmatien und Albanien

 Hafenkommandant Ajaccio
 Hafenkommandant Ancona	
 Hafenkommandant Cattaro 	
 Hafenkommandant Cherso
 Hafenkommandant Dubrovnik 
 Hafenkommandant Durazzo 	
 Hafenkommandant Fiume 
 Hafenkommandant Genua
 Hafenkommandant Gravosa
 Hafenkommandant La Spezia
 Hafenkommandant Livorno 
 Hafenkommandant Pola 
 Hafenkommandant Ravenna 	
 Hafenkommandant Sebenico
 Hafenkommandant Senj
 Hafenkommandant Sestri Levante
 Hafenkommandant Split
 Hafenkommandant Triest
 Hafenkommandant Valona
 Hafenkommandant Venedig 	
 Hafenkommandant Viareggio 	
 Hafenkommandant Zara

Hafenkapitäne im Bereich Italien

 Hafenkapitän Bonifacio
 Hafenkapitän Burano
 Hafenkapitän Caorle
 Hafenkapitän Fano 
 Hafenkapitän Imperia
 Hafenkapitän Pesaro
 Hafenkapitän Porto Ferraie
 Hafenkapitän Rimini
 Hafenkapitän San Remo 
 Hafenkapitän Santa Margherita
 Hafenkapitän Savona
 Hafenkapitän Senigallia
 Hafenkapitän Senstri Lavante 	
 Hafenkapitän Ventimiglia

References

Kriegsmarine
Naval